Chhaya Ghosh (15 August 1940 – 12 February 2010) was a minister in the Indian state of West Bengal and was a Forward Bloc leader.

Political career
She was elected to the West Bengal state assembly from Murshidabad (Vidhan Sabha constituency) in 1977, 1982, 1991 and 2001. She was minister for relief from 1991 to 1996, and of the agricultural marketing department from 2001 to 2005.

Later life
A former school teacher she was brought into politics by Hemanta Bose. At the end of her life she broke with the Forward Block. For the 2006 state assembly elections, Forward Bloc denied her a ticket. She joined the Janabadi Forward Bloc.

She died of age-related problems on 12 February 2010. Her lawyer husband predeceased her. She left behind two daughters.

References

1940 births
2010 deaths
West Bengal MLAs 1977–1982
West Bengal MLAs 1982–1987
West Bengal MLAs 1991–1996
West Bengal MLAs 2001–2006
All India Forward Bloc politicians
State cabinet ministers of West Bengal